Margit Wennmachers is a venture capitalist at the Silicon Valley venture capital firm Andreessen Horowitz and a co-founder of OutCast Communications (now The OutCast Agency), one of the tech world's top public relations firms according to The New York Times. She is one of a handful of women at high-profile venture capital firms and among the few venture capital marketing executives at the partner level.

Biography 
Born and raised in Breberen, Germany, Wennmachers' father was a mushroom farmer who pivoted to raising pigs. She was the youngest of four children. Her mother died in a car accident when she was 18. Wennmachers earned a bachelor's degree in business from the University of Lippstadt, Germany.

Career
Wennmachers began her career in the European office of a U.S.-based startup. She later moved to San Francisco to join Blanc & Otus, a high-tech communications firm. In 1997, she co-founded OutCast Communications with Caryn Marooney. By 2010, their clients had included Facebook, Autodesk, Amazon, Yahoo!, EMC, Netflix, Cisco, Zimbra and VMware, as well as Andreessen Horowitz.  Under her’ leadership, OutCast grew from two employees to a multimillion-dollar business.

Wennmachers became a partner of Andreessen Horowitz in September 2010 to help identify and evaluate new start-ups for investment potential and advise the firm and its portfolio companies on marketing and branding.  Andreessen Horowitz's investments include Twitter, Jawbone, Facebook, Foursquare, Groupon, and Zynga.

Wennmachers became a non-executive director at Next Fifteen Communications Group plc in 2011. She also serves on the board of trustees for the World Affairs Council. She has been a speaker at the DLD Conference in 2011 and 2013, Ad: Tech in 2012, Upward in 2014, and The Spark in 2016.

Wennmachers was named to Silicon Valley/San Jose Business Journal's list of 100 Women of Influence for 2012.

References

External links
 Andreessen Horowitz Website

Living people
American computer businesspeople
American venture capitalists
American company founders
American women company founders
American women investors
Year of birth missing (living people)
21st-century American businesswomen
21st-century American businesspeople